Bishop of North West Australia may refer to:

 Anglican Bishop of North West Australia
 Bishop of the Roman Catholic Diocese of Broome
 Bishop of the Roman Catholic Diocese of Geraldton